Strč prst skrz krk is a Czech and Slovak tongue-twister meaning "stick a finger through the neck".

The sentence is well known for being a semantically and syntactically valid clause without a single vowel, the nucleus of each syllable being a syllabic r, a common feature among many Slavic languages. It is often used as an example of such a phrase when learning Czech or Slovak as a foreign language.

In fact, both Czech and Slovak have two syllabic liquid consonants, the other being syllabic l. As a result, there are plenty of words without vowels.

The longest Czech vowelless sentence (with 25 words and 82 consonants) as of 2013 is Škrt plch z mlh Brd pln skvrn z mrv prv hrd scvrnkl z brzd skrz trs chrp v krs vrb mls mrch srn čtvrthrst zrn. The meaning of the sentence is: Stingy dormouse from Brdy mountains fogs full of manure spots firstly proudly shrank a quarter of handful seeds, a delicacy for mean does, from brakes through bunch of Centaurea flowers into scrub of willows. IPA pronunciation of this sentence is [ʃkr̩t pl̩x zml̩x br̩t pl̩n skvr̩n zmr̩f pr̩f ɦr̩t st͡svrn̩kl̩ zbr̩st skr̩s tr̩s xr̩p fkr̩s vr̩p ml̩s mr̩x sr̩n t͡ʃtvrdɦr̩st zr̩n].

See also
 Shibboleth
 Consonant cluster

References

Czech language
Word games
Tongue-twisters
Phonotactics
Slovak language
Articles containing video clips